The canton of Borgo is an administrative division of the Haute-Corse department, southeastern France. Its borders were modified at the French canton reorganisation which came into effect in March 2015. Its seat is in Borgo.

It consists of the following communes:
Borgo
Lucciana 
Vignale

References

Cantons of Haute-Corse